Playgirlz is the debut Japanese studio album of South Korean girl group After School, released on March 14, 2012 in Japan under Avex Trax. The album was released in three versions, a CD & DVD Limited Press Edition, a CD & DVD Edition and a regular CD Edition. It was preceded by the singles "Bang!", "Diva" and double A-side "Rambling Girls/Because of You".

Editions
The album was released in three different editions: CD & DVD Limited Press Edition, CD & DVD Edition, and the Regular CD Edition.

The CD & DVD Limited Press Edition contains the CD album, and a DVD containing the "Japan Premium Party -Bang! Bang! Bang!- Live at AKASAKA BLITZ" show, along with Playcards and 1 trading card randomly selected out of 9 different styles.

The CD & DVD Edition contains the CD album and a DVD containing the 5 Original Japanese Version music videos, and three Japanese Dance Edit Version music videos of Bang!, Diva and Rambling Girls. It all comes in a cardboard slipcase, once again including 1 trading card out of 9 different styles along with other trading cards. The DVD also includes Bonus Content including the original Shanghai Romance Korean music video, and miscellaneous After School special footage.

The CD Regular Edition of Playgirlz contains only the CD album itself, along with a Japanese Version of Orange Caramel's "Shanghai Romance" as a bonus track.

Track listing

Chart performance

Oricon chart

Other charts

Release history

Notes

References 

2012 albums
Japanese-language albums
Avex Group albums
After School (band) albums
Albums recorded at Akasaka Blitz
Hybe Corporation albums